The Privilege of Power is the seventh studio album by American heavy metal band Riot. It was more experimental than their previous work, being an attempt at a concept album and also including a horn section on some of the tracks.

"Racing with the Devil on a Spanish Highway" is a cover of an Al Di Meola instrumental track from the album Elegant Gypsy (1977). "Killer" is about convicted killer Jeffrey R. MacDonald and features a guest vocal appearance by Joe Lynn Turner (ex-Rainbow, Yngwie Malmsteen).

The album was re-issued in 2003 by Collectables Records with slightly amended artwork and re-issued on 180g vinyl as a 2-LP set with Thundersteel by SPV on February 25, 2013.

Critical reception

In 2005, The Privilege of Power was ranked number 354 in Rock Hard magazine's book of The 500 Greatest Rock & Metal Albums of All Time.

Track listing

Personnel

Band members
Tony Moore - vocals
Mark Reale - guitars, producer
Don Van Stavern - bass
Bobby Jarzombek - drums

Additional musicians
Tower of Power horn section: Greg Adams, Emilio Castillio, Steve Kupka, Lee Thornburg, Steve Gross
Randy Brecker, Jon Faddis, Dave Bargeron, Ron Cuber, Lawrence Feldman - horn section
James 'Blood' Ulmer - guitar
G. E. Smith - guitar
T. M. Stevens - bass
Joe Lynn Turner - vocals on "Killer"
 Bob Held - bass on "Little Miss Death"

Production
Steve Loeb - producer, executive producer
Vince Perazzo - executive producer
Rod Hui - producer, engineer, mixing
Nick Sansano, Chris Shaw, Kirk Yano - engineers
Dan Wood, Dave Swanson, Jason Vogel, Kenny Almestica, Glenn Zimet - assistant engineers

References

Riot V albums
1990 albums
Epic Records albums
Concept albums